La Ruche ("The Hive") was a French school founded by Sébastien Faure on anarchist principles.

History 

The anarchist Sébastien Faure founded La Ruche on 20 hectares of leased farmland in Le Pâtis, near Rambouillet, on the outskirts of Paris in 1904. The land was both the grounds for his alternative, experimental school and an anarchist commune. The school's name, La Ruche, or "The Hive", comes from the land's resource of honey, which the school used as supplementary income. Faure also funded the school through his lectures and books. He established a cooperative to buy and market the farm's produce. La Ruche operated as a soviet, following the will of the staff's weekly general assembly. The colony persisted through the end of World War I, when it closed under Faure's financial deficits.

Program 

The school followed a program modeled on that of anarchist pedagogue Paul Robin. About 50 children between the ages of 5 and 16 attended the school, selected from an applicant pool. Children of politically repressed families were given special consideration, such as those of Émile Henry. Ideologically, Faure did not impose his anarchist beliefs on the children, but afforded the children full autonomy—they were not coerced into a specific course of study. La Ruche offered Esperanto lessons through the age of 10, when children were put into pre-apprenticeships that rotated between workshops multiple times per month. They began formal apprenticeships with a wage at the age of 13, whereupon they produced goods for the school. La Ruche used Paul Robin's approach to sex education and mixed-gender classes.

Teachers were unpaid. A common fund provided for their needs and lodging. There were no checks on the disbursement of the fund and there are no records of the arrangement being an issue.

Legacy 

Following La Ruche closure, Faure's disciple Aristide Lapeyre established the Elan school of Villeneuve-sur-Lot, which persisted from the 1930s through World War II.

See also 

 Julia Bertrand, a teacher at the school
 Marcel Voisin, a handyman at the school

References

Bibliography

Further reading 

 

Anarchism and education
Schools in France
Anarchist communities
Alternative schools
Organizations established in 1904